Virginia State Route 9 (SR 9) is a primary state highway in the U.S. state of Virginia.  Known as Charles Town Pike, the state highway runs  from the West Virginia state line near Mechanicsville, where the highway continues west as West Virginia Route 9 (WV 9), east to SR 7 and SR 7 Business in Paeonian Springs.  SR 9 is the main east–west highway of northwestern Loudoun County, connecting Leesburg with Hillsboro and the West Virginia cities of Charles Town and Martinsburg.  As a result, the state highway and its West Virginia continuation are a major, overburdened commuter route between the Eastern Panhandle of West Virginia and Washington, D.C.

Route description

SR 9 begins at the West Virginia state line at Keyes Gap, a wind gap on top of Blue Ridge Mountain.  The highway continues west as WV 9 to Charles Town.  SR 9 heads southeast as a two-lane undivided road, passing to the west of Purcell Knob as the highway descends Blue Ridge Mountain to the village of Mechanicsville in a valley known as Between the Hills.  At the eastern edge of the narrow north–south valley, the state highway parallels the North Fork of Catoctin Creek through Hillsboro Gap, a water gap in Short Hill Mountain, into the town of Hillsboro.  SR 9 continues east through the much wider Catoctin Valley, crossing the North Fork and intersecting SR 287 in the hamlet of Wheatland.  The state highway veers southeast and crosses the South Fork of Catoctin Creek before reaching the community of Paeonian Springs.  SR 9 curves south to its eastern terminus at Clarke's Gap, a low point in Catoctin Mountain.  The state highway expands to a four-lane divided highway and meets SR 7 (Harry Byrd Highway) at a diamond interchange.  SR 9 is paralleled through the interchange by the Washington and Old Dominion Trail.  At the southern end of the interchange, the highway continues southward as SR 7 Business (Colonial Highway), which immediately turns west toward Hamilton.

History
The road was commissioned in 1928 as State Route 713. After the 1933 renumbering, the route became State Route 238. After the 1940 renumbering, it became its current designation.

Future
SR 9 has been the subject of considerable debate.  West Virginia has converted its Route 9 to a four-lane highway to U.S. Route 340 in Charles Town.  The expressway ends at the Virginia state line, raising concerns in Loudoun County about increasing traffic along the road's narrow, winding stretch through the town of Hillsboro. A bypass of Hillsboro was last proposed in 2008 and eventually removed from the county's draft 2010 transportation plan after protracted debate. A significant physical obstacle is that the town completely fills Hillsboro Gap, making any in-place widening impossible and requiring any separate bypass to go over or through Short Hill Mountain.

Instead, the town of Hillsboro is studying traffic calming measures in hopes of encouraging West Virginia traffic to detour through Clarke County via U.S. Route 340 and Virginia State Route 7.

The Commonwealth Transportation Board voted to make the entire length of SR 9 a Virginia Byway on March 21, 2002.

Major intersections

References

External links

Virginia Highways Project: VA 9

009
State Route 009